Stupnytsia is a village (selo) in Drohobych Raion, Lviv Oblast, in south-west Ukraine. It belongs to Drohobych urban hromada, one of the hromadas of Ukraine.

The village was first mentioned in 1377.

References 

Villages in Drohobych Raion